Muhammad Moin Khan (born 23 September 1971) is a Pakistani cricket administrator, coach and former cricketer, primarily a wicketkeeper-batsman, who remained a member of the Pakistani national cricket team from 1990 to 2004. He has also captained the Pakistani side. 

He made his international debut against the West Indies at Multan. 

He took over 100 catches in Test cricket, has scored over 3,000 ODI runs and taken over 200 catches in ODI cricket. 

He is credited with coining the name of Saqlain Mushtaq's mystery delivery that goes from leg to off, as the doosra. It means the "other one" in Urdu.

Personal life
Khan's elder son Owais married to television actress Mariam Ansari in February 2021. 

His younger son Azam Khan made his T20I debut for Pakistan against England in July 2021 and played for Quetta Gladiators in the PSL.

Cricket career

International career

Throughout his international career, Moin had to compete with another wicket-keeper, Rashid Latif. Moin kept wickets in the 1992 Cricket World Cup which Pakistan won and the 1999 Cricket World Cup where Pakistan finished runners up. Latif kept wickets in the 1996 Cricket World Cup and the 2003 Cricket World Cup.

During the 1992 Cricket World Cup Semi-final against New Zealand, Pakistan needed 9 runs for 8 balls before Khan hit a six to make it 3 runs off 7 balls and then hit a boundary to help Pakistan set up a clash in the World Cup final with England. In the World Cup final, Pakistan were 249 from 50 overs with Khan not getting a chance to bat. However, he took three catches in the match including one of Ian Botham, who went for a duck against an inswinger bowled by Wasim Akram.

Domestic career
In 2005, Moin scored the first century in Pakistan domestic Twenty20 cricket when he smashed 112 off 59 balls for Karachi Dolphins against Lahore Lions in the ABN-AMRO Twenty-20 Cup. At the end of the season, he retired from cricket finishing with 200 not out against Hyderabad, his highest first-class score.

In 2007, Moin signed with the unofficial Indian Cricket League and coached the Hyderabad Heroes. In the 2008 edition of the competition, he coached the expansion team, the Lahore Badshahs.

Cricket administration and coaching career

Moin Khan runs his own academy situated in Karachi, a city where he has relocated since many years, named DHA Sports Club Moin Khan Academy, that provides facilities not only in cricket but also in other sports such as football, squash and swimming.

In July 2013, he replaced Iqbal Qasim as the chief selector of the Pakistan cricket team. But in 2015, during the Cricket World Cup 2015, he was removed from the position after the team's poor performance during the World Cup.

In August 2013, he was appointed the manager of the team. 

In February 2014, he was appointed as the new head coach of the national team, replacing Dav Whatmore.

Since 2016, he has been serving as the head coach of the PSL franchise Quetta Gladiators.

Controversies

Domestic violence
In January 2007, Moin Khan was freed on bail after a short detention following his wife Tasneem Khan's complaint to a local police helpline that she was beaten up.

Casino visit
In February 2015, Moin Khan, who was the chief selector of Pakistan team, went under investigation for allegedly visiting a casino before Pakistan team's heavy loss to West Indies in World Cup 2015. Moin Khan later apologized for his actions but reiterated that he just went to the casino to have dinner. In March 2015, PCB accepted Moin Khan's casino explanation and said that there will be no action taken against him.

Television

References

External links

ICL Profile

1971 births
Living people
Cricketers from Rawalpindi
Moin Khan
Moin Khan
Moin Khan
Pakistan Test cricketers
Pakistani cricket captains
Moin Khan
Cricketers at the 1992 Cricket World Cup
Cricketers at the 1999 Cricket World Cup
ICL Pakistan XI cricketers
Hyderabad Heroes cricketers
Indian Cricket League coaches
Pakistani cricketers
Karachi Whites cricketers
Karachi Blues cricketers
Karachi Dolphins cricketers
Pakistan Super League coaches
Coaches of the Pakistan national cricket team
Pakistani cricket coaches
Wicket-keepers
Pakistani cricket administrators